Boomania is the debut album by the British singer Betty Boo, released on 10 September 1990. King John (a duo comprising Rex Brough and John Coxon) produced most of the songs on the album; Coxon continued to collaborate with Betty Boo on her second album, GRRR! It's Betty Boo in 1992.

In 1999, the album was reissued as Doin' the Do: The Best of Betty Boo. This edition consists of all the tracks from Boomania in a slightly different order, alongside extended versions of two of its singles, a remix, and a megamix, all of which were included on a later reissue of the original album by Cherry Pop Records. Its cover art features a mirrored version of the photo from the front of Boomania.

Track listings 

Notes
 denotes an additional producer.
 denotes tracks on Doin' the Do: The Best of Betty Boo that were not included on the original edition of Boomania.
Engineered by Mark Gilbert.
"Hey DJ / I Can't Dance (To That Music You're Playing)" is a reworking of "I Can't Dance to That Music You're Playing" by Martha Reeves and the Vandellas.
"Boo Is Booming" samples "Montego Bay" by Bobby Bloom.
"Doin' the Do" samples the 1968 song "Captain of Your Ship" by Reparata and the Delrons.
Some original CD and cassette releases omit the bonus tracks. The UK cassette includes the bonus tracks, but "Doin' the Do (7" Radio Mix)" is moved to the end of side one, after "Valentine's Day".

Charts

References

External links 

Boomania entry at the Official Charts Company

1990 debut albums
Betty Boo albums
Albums produced by William Orbit
Sire Records albums
Interscope Records albums